The 2013–14 season was Ulster's 20th season since the advent of professionalism in rugby union, and their second under head coach Mark Anscombe. They competed in the Heineken Cup and the Pro12.

They finished fourth in the Pro12, qualifying for the semi-finals and next season's Champions Cup. They lost the semi-final to Leinster. Ulster and Connacht jointly won the Fair Play Award, and wing Andrew Trimble and lock Johann Muller made the Pro12 Dream Team. They topped their pool in the Champions Cup, qualifying for the quarter-final, which they lost to Saracens. Out-half Paddy Jackson was leading scorer with 239 points. Andrew Trimble, wing Tommy Bowe and centre Luke Marshall were joint leading try scorers with six each. Andrew Trimble was Ulster's Player of the Year, and IRUPA Players' Player of the Year.

Johann Muller, flanker Stephen Ferris and utility back Paddy Wallace retired at the end of the season. Props John Afoa moved to Gloucester, and Tom Court to London Irish. David Humphreys left as director of rugby to take up the same post at Gloucester. A few weeks later, head coach Mark Anscombe resigned. Les Kiss took over as director of rugby, and Neil Doak as head coach.

Staff

Squad

Senior squad

Players in (Season 2013/2014)
  James McKinney from Rotherham R.U.F.C.
  David McIlwaine from Bristol Rugby
  Bronson Ross from Coventry R.F.C.

Players out (Season 2013/2014)
  Niall O'Connor to Jersey R.F.C.
  Nigel Brady to Stade Aurillacois
  Ali Birch to Rotherham R.U.F.C.
  Adam D'Arcy to Bristol Rugby
  Blane McIlroy (released)

Academy squad

Heineken Cup

Pool 5

Quarter-final

Pro12

Semi-final

End-of-season awards
Ulster and Connacht jointly won the Fair Play award. Wing Andrew Trimble and lock Johann Muller were named in the Pro12 Dream Team.

Ulster Ravens

British and Irish Cup

Pool 6

Home attendance

Ulster Rugby Awards
The Ulster Rugby Awards ceremony was held at the Europa Hotel, Belfast, on 5 May 2014. Winners were:

Bank of Ireland Ulster Player of the Year: Andrew Trimble
Heineken Ulster Rugby Personality of the Year: Johann Muller
BT Young Player of the Year: Paddy Jackson
Rugby Writers Player of the Year: Andrew Trimble
Ulster Rugby Supporters Club Player of the Year: Andrew Trimble
Abbey Insurance Academy Player of the Year: Stuart McCloskey
Ulster Carpets Youth Player of the Year: Adam McBurney
Danske Bank Ulster Schools Player of the Year: Jacob Stockdale, Wallace High

References

2013-14
2013–14 in Irish rugby union
2013–14 Pro12 by team
2013–14 Heineken Cup by team